"The Indian Hunter" is a 1842 song.

Indian Hunter may also refer to:
 Indian Hunter (Manship), a sculpture by Paul Manship
 Indian Hunter (Ward), a sculpture by Quincy Adams Ward